This is a list of minor characters from the television series The Sarah Jane Adventures.

A

Androvax 
Androvax, also known as Androvax the Veil, was an alien criminal first appearing in "Prisoner of the Judoon" who was wanted for twelve counts of global genocide by the Judoon after having begun a campaign of extermination when his species was wiped out by their dying star. Captured by Captain Tybo of the Judoon, Androvax escaped upon the Earth when the prison ship crashed and was chased by Tybo, Sarah Jane and her friends. Using nanotechnology, Androvax built a replica of the ship from the Roswell crash in 1947 to escape, but was defeated and captured.

In "The Vault of Secrets", an escaped Androvax returns to Earth after learning during his trial that a hundred members of his species escaped the destruction of their world and survive in cryogenic sleep on a ship in a hyperdimensional vault on Earth. Running afoul of Sarah Jane's team again, Androvax, dying after being fatally poisoned during his escape, earns their sympathy and help. Androvax succeeds in recovering the ship containing the survivors of his race, but his attempt to launch the ship from inside the vault puts the Earth into danger. Sarah Jane manages to get Mister Dread to safely teleport the ship into outer space where Androvax departs to find a new home for his species.

In Doctor Who series 8's "Time Heist", the bank robber Psi displays images of the universe's most wanted criminals to distract the alien Teller. Androvax is one of the criminals he displays.

B

Bane Mother 
The Bane Mother, seen in "Invasion of the Bane", is a very large Bane hidden in the roof of the Bubble Shock! factory controlling the Bane invasion of Earth. She is disturbed by Kelsey Hooper's mobile phone and eventually destroyed in the explosion caused by Luke Smith's activation of the Arcateen 5 alien's summoning device.

C

Gita Chandra 
Gita Chandra, played by Mina Anwar, is the mother of Rani Chandra (Anjili Mohindra). In The Day of the Clown, along with her husband, Haresh Chandra and daughter, Rani, Gita moves into the Jacksons' old house on Bannerman Road opposite Sarah Jane and Luke Smith's house. Gita Chandra replaces the character Chrissie Jackson who leaves with Alan Jackson and Maria Jackson.

Haresh Chandra 
Haresh Chandra, played by Ace Bhatti, is the father of Rani Chandra. In The Day of the Clown, along with his wife, Gita Chandra (Mina Anwar) and daughter, Rani, Haresh moves into the Jacksons' old house on Bannerman Road opposite Sarah Jane and Luke Smith's house. Haresh Chandra replaces the character Alan Jackson who leaves with Chrissie Jackson and Maria Jackson. He is also the new headmaster of Park Vale High School, in which role he quickly forms an antagonistic relationship with Clyde Langer.

D

The Doctor

Davey 
Davey, played by Jamie Davis, and referred to as 'the muffin' by Kelsey Hooper, was first seen in "Invasion of the Bane". He is really a Bane who poses as a PR officer for Bubble Shock! and gives tours of the Bubble Shock! factory. He is also responsible for security and scanning the visitors to provide modelling information for the Bubble Shock! scientists developing the Archetype. He is young and somewhat cocky as well as slightly naïve; his training on human culture led him to believe that a male entering a female-use bathroom was an unforgivable taboo of the culture. Mrs Wormwood assigns Davey to assassinate Sarah Jane Smith but he was beaten back by a special anti-repellant spray which Sarah uses against him. When he fails, Mrs Wormwood informs him that he will become food for the Bane Mother.

H

Kelsey Hooper 
Kelsey Hooper, played by Porsha Lawrence-Mavour, is a resident of Bannerman Road who befriends Maria Jackson shortly after Maria and her father Alan move in down the road in the introductory episode, "Invasion of the Bane".

One of the 98% of the population addicted to the soft drink Bubble Shock!, Kelsey took Maria to see the Bubble Shock! factory, where she became embroiled in Sarah Jane Smith's attempt to fight off the invading aliens, the Bane. However, Kelsey fell under the Bane's control owing to her addiction. When Sarah Jane, Maria and Luke Smith defeated the Bane, Kelsey had reportedly recovered, but was denying the existence of aliens.

She is attracted to the human form of Davey and to Luke and likes Hollyoaks. She wonders if she is fat, and if she will ever be kissed.

The character was dropped from the series following the "Invasion of the Bane", possibly because she received poor reception from fans, and was replaced by the more easy-going Clyde Langer played by Daniel Anthony in the first series.

J

Alan Jackson 

Alan Jackson, played by Joseph Millson, is Maria Jackson's father. He is divorced from Maria's mother, Chrissie, and he and Maria are seen moving into Bannerman Road in "Invasion of the Bane". He works in IT, blocking super-viruses; he once did an IT job in a school, and is capable, in The Lost Boy, of obtaining an 'Armageddon Virus' that completely wipes out Mr Smith's databanks. He was one of the 98 per cent of the population that became addicted to Bubble Shock! during the Bane's attempted invasion of Earth. He later made a full recovery. Alan and Chrissie appear to still get on when she visits Maria, however Revenge of the Slitheen indicates there is some tension between them, Maria commenting that they used to argue a lot when they lived together. In the episode Whatever Happened to Sarah Jane? Alan becomes involved in fighting of an alien plot, and thus becomes aware of the existence of extraterrestrial life, Mr Smith and of his daughter's involvement with aliens. He appeared in all stories of the first series, except for Warriors of Kudlak. During the Dalek invasion of Earth in the Doctor Who episodes "The Stolen Earth" and "Journey's End, he was in Cornwall with Maria.

In the first story of the second season, The Last Sontaran, Alan is offered a job in America, but is unsure about taking it. At the end of the story he takes the job, and he and Maria leave Bannerman Road. However, the group still call for his computer expertise on occasion; Millson appears as Alan Jackson via webcam in The Mark of the Berserker, when in Sarah Jane's absence, Luke and Rani require him to hack into a UNIT database for critical information. He also subsequently uses UNIT technology to track the location of Clyde Langer and his own skills to get in contact with Sarah Jane.

K

K-9 Mark IV 

Sarah Jane Smith's pet robot dog, K-9 Mark IV, voiced by John Leeson, is away for much of the series' run, sealing a black hole created by scientists in Switzerland. In the pilot episode, "Invasion of the Bane", Sarah Jane states that he has been away for a year and a half. His orbit brings him into brief contact with Sarah Jane every so often, as seen in "Invasion of the Bane".

He also plays a major role toward the end of the final episode of Series 1. By exchanging laser fire with Mr Smith, K-9 provides Sarah Jane with the distraction she needs to download the Armageddon Virus into Mr Smith. After this fight, K-9 returns to the black hole.

In the finale of Doctor Who Series 4, "Journey's End", Sarah Jane calls on K-9 to leave the black hole again to transmit the TARDIS base code to Mr Smith so that the latter can access its navigation system and direct the TARDIS back to the solar system whilst towing the Earth home.

In Series 3, K-9 permanently leaves the black hole because Eve's ship needed to use the black hole's energy, thus closing it.  K-9 departs the Smith home again in "The Nightmare Man", when Sarah Jane sends him off to be Luke's companion at Oxford University.

L

Carla Langer 
Carla Langer, played Jocelyn Jee Esien, is the mother of Clyde Langer (Daniel Anthony). She is mentioned throughout the first and second series before making her debut in the second series serial The Mark of the Berserker. Prior to the programme, she and Clyde lived in Hounslow before moving to Ealing after her ex-husband and Clyde's father, Paul Langer, left them and went to live in Germany with Carla's sister, Melba. She subsequently appears in The Empty Planet and The Curse of Clyde Langer.

During the Dalek invasion of Earth in the Doctor Who episodes "The Stolen Earth" and "Journey's End", she and Clyde took shelter together.

Lesley 
Lesley, played by Rungano Nyoni, was Mrs Wormwood's PA and Secretary at Bubble Shock! as seen in "Invasion of the Bane". Although not seen in Bane form, as with the rest of the factory workers, it was implied she was a Bane. She was tasked with killing Sarah Jane Smith in a lift. However, Sarah spotted her in a mirror and intercepted the attack, wounding Lesley.

Brigadier Sir Alistair Gordon Lethbridge-Stewart 

Retired UNIT commanding officer and Sarah Jane's friend since 1973, Brigadier Sir Alistair Gordon Lethbridge-Stewart is shown in a photograph in Sarah Jane's attic in the pilot episode, "Invasion of the Bane". He returns in-person in "Enemy of the Bane", having been a frequent companion of the Doctor on Doctor Who from The Web of Fear through Battlefield and the (arguably non-canonical) special "Dimensions in Time".  He co-stars with Sarah Jane and fellow former companion Victoria Waterfield in the direct-to-video movie, Downtime. In addition to his guest starring return in Enemy of the Bane, he is referred to in "Invasion of the Bane", Revenge of the Slitheen, The Wedding of Sarah Jane Smith and Death of the Doctor. Sarah Jane considers naming Luke after him when selecting the boy's name.

M

Mr Smith 
Mr Smith is a fictional extraterrestrial computer voiced by Alexander Armstrong which appears in the British children's science fiction television series, The Sarah Jane Adventures, with further minor appearances in the final two episodes of the fourth series of Doctor Who. He is installed in the attic of Sarah Jane Smith's (Elisabeth Sladen) home, and is used to hack into other systems; Sarah Jane asserts that he can hack "into anything". He first appeared in the premiere New Year's Day special "Invasion of the Bane" (2007) and has appeared in every story except The Eternity Trap (2009).

See also 
List of The Sarah Jane Adventures monsters and aliens
List of Doctor Who supporting characters
List of Doctor Who villains
List of Torchwood characters

References 

 
Sarah Jane
Sarah Jane